Monty is a masculine given name and nickname and also occasionally a surname.

Monty may also refer to:

Music
 The Monty (band), a UK party covers band
 Monty (singer) or Jacques Bulostin (born 1943), French singer and songwriter
 "Monty" (song), a song by Spiderbait

Other uses
 Monty (comic strip), an American comic strip
 Monty (robot), a two-wheeled balancing humanoid robot
 Monty (TV series), a short-lived Fox sitcom
 Cyclone Monty, a storm that made landfall in Western Australia in 2004

See also
Monte (disambiguation)
Monti (disambiguation)
Montie (disambiguation)